Brian Lynch is an Irish writer of poetry, plays, fiction and other mediums.

Life
Brian Lynch was born in Dublin in 1945 and continues to live there.

He worked as a journalist for the Evening Press and The Hibernia Magazine.  He was an advisor to the Irish government.  During the 1970s, he was a spokesman for Attorney General of Ireland Declan Costello. He participated in the Sunningdale Conference in 1973.

He writes poetry, plays, fictions and other material. He established and edited The Holy Door, a literary journal, which published such writers as W.H. Auden, Anthony Cronin, Aidan Higgins and Patrick Kavanagh.

He established Duras Press, an independent literary publisher.

Works

Poetry
 Endsville (with Paul Durcan) (Dublin: New Writers’ Press 1967), 59pp.;
 Beds of Down (Dublin: Raven Arts 1983), 46pp.;
 Sixty-Five Poems [of] Paul Celan  (trans., with Peter Jankowsky) (Dublin: Raven Arts 1985), 88pp.;
 No Die Cast (New Writers’ Co-op. 1969), [12]pp. [ltd. edn. 75];
 Outside the Pheasantry (Gorey: Funge Arts Centre 1976), 16pp., ill. [by Paul Funge];
 Perpetual Star (Dublin: Raven Arts 1980), 47pp.;
 Voices from the Nettle-way (Dublin: Raven Arts 1989), 60pp.;
 Poesie a Lerici (TCD: Dept. of Italian 2003), 59pp. [chapbook of reading in Lerici, Spezia];
 New and Revised: Poems 1967-2004 (Dublin: New Island Press 2004), 120pp.;
 Pity for the Wicked, with a preface by Conor Cruise O’Brien (Dublin [Killiney]: Duras Press 2005), 78pp.

Fiction
 The Winner of Sorrow (Dublin: New Island Press 2005), 300pp.
 The Woman Not the Name (Dublin: Duras Press 2013), 342pp.

Plays
 Crooked in the Car Seat (Dublin Th. Fest. 1979);
 Days Lost Behind the Curtain (1985);
 Caught in a Free State (1983) [screenplay about German spies in Ireland];
 Love and Rage (1999), dir. Cathal Black.

Awards
 Member, Aosdána
 1979: Crooked in the Car Seat nominated in the Best Play category of the Harvey's Theatre Awards
 2005: The Winner of Sorrow shortlisted for the Hughes & Hughes Irish Book Awards.

See also
 List of Irish writers

References

Aosdána members
20th-century Irish male writers
21st-century Irish male writers
Irish poets
Writers from Dublin (city)
1945 births
Living people